The 2009 V8 Supercar Championship Series was the eleventh V8 Supercar Championship Series and the thirteenth series in which V8 Supercars have contested the premier Australian touring car title. It began on 19 March at the Clipsal 500 on the streets of Adelaide and ended on 6 December at the Homebush Street Circuit and consisted of 26 races over 14 events which were held in all states and the Northern Territory of Australia as well as New Zealand. The 50th Australian Touring Car Championship title was awarded to the winner of the series by the Confederation of Australian Motor Sport.

Triple Eight Race Engineering Ford driver Jamie Whincup won the Championship from Holden drivers Will Davison and Garth Tander. Championship races were also won by Craig Lowndes, Michael Caruso, James Courtney and Mark Winterbottom. The two-driver endurance races, held at the Phillip Island Grand Prix Circuit and at the Mount Panorama Circuit, Bathurst, were both won by Tander and Davison.

Race calendar
The following events made up the 2009 series.

The Desert 400 originally scheduled to take place on 5–7 November was moved into the 2010 season. A replacement event, The Island 300, was announced in late September at Phillip Island. The Nikon SuperGP altered its format at late notice after the cancellation of the A1 Grand Prix event which was due to be held at the same event. The two by 200 kilometre races were altered to two races each split into two 150 kilometre legs. Race winners were declared on the basis of accumulated points over the two legs held each day.

Teams and drivers
The following teams and drivers contested the 2009 series. This list is based in part on

Driver and team changes
Ford announced that from 2009, it would only offer financial support for Ford Performance Racing and Stone Brothers Racing, having previously provided funding for Triple Eight Race Engineering, Dick Johnson Racing, Britek Motorsport, Paul Cruickshank Racing and Ford Rising Stars Racing. The remaining Ford backed teams retained levels of parts and in-kind support. 

Similarly Holden announced several teams would be cut from their financial support budget, with Garry Rogers Motorsport, Perkins Motorsport, Sprint Gas Racing and Rod Nash Racing  losing their direct funding, although like the Ford counterparts they still received technical and parts assistance. The new Kelly Racing Team received the funding previously given to HSV Dealer Team.

The works Toll Holden Racing Team remained at two cars, but a secondary two-car team was set up under the Walkinshaw Performance banner.  Racing Entitlements Contracts were purchased from Paul Weel Racing, which had closed at the end of 2008, and the 30th franchise from the former Walden Motorsport team. Will Davison replaced the retiring Mark Skaife alongside Garth Tander at Toll HRT while Paul Dumbrell was signed to drive the Autobarn-backed number 10 Walkinshaw Performance entry, with David Reynolds rounding up the line-up in a Bundaberg Red-backed entry.

Stone Brothers Racing expanded to three cars with Jason Bright folding his own Britek Motorsport operation to utilise one of his team franchises for SBR's expansion. Bright started the season in a BF Falcon, before switching mid-season to a new FG Falcon.  Shane van Gisbergen continued in the lead SP Tools-sponsored car in an FG Falcon alongside Alex Davison who replaced the departing James Courtney in an Irwin Tools sponsored car.
Courtney joined Steven Johnson at Dick Johnson Racing.

The second Paul Weel Racing, (ex-Ford Rising Stars Racing) franchise was used to start a new race team, Team IntaRacing, based in Southport.  It utilised a Triple Eight Race Engineering sourced BF Falcon and equipment and was centred around former Britek driver, Marcus Marshall with funding coming from new V8 Supercar sponsor Intabill. The Intabill Access Card sponsorship was pulled from the car shortly before the Hamilton 400 but Marshall vowed the sponsorless team would continue. The team subsequently collapsed and the Racing Entitlement Contract was absorbed by V8 Supercar Australia.

Another new team in 2009 was Kelly Racing, formed by John and Margaret Kelly utilising the franchises from the defunct HSV Dealer Team running Holden Commodores for their sons, Todd and Rick Kelly. A four-car superteam was established, with the second pair of franchises being sourced from Perkins Motorsport. The third and fourth drivers were announced as Todd Kelly's 2008 teammate Jack Perkins (supported by Dodo Internet) and Dale Wood. Wood was replaced after the Hidden Valley weekend with Mark McNally taking over the #16 Commodore for the Townsville 400.

Jason Bargwanna returned to a full-time drive joining Greg Murphy at Sprint Gas Racing taking the place of Jason Richards. Bargwanna spent a season on the sidelines after WPS Racing folded prior to the 2008 V8 Supercar season. Jason Richards was confirmed as Andrew Jones' replacement at Team BOC.

Michael Patrizi joined Fabian Coulthard as the drivers of a revamped Wilson Security Racing (PCR) in 2009. PCR expanded from a one-car team by leasing a franchise from Jason Bright's team for Patrizi to run the #333 BF Falcon alongside Coulthard in a Triple Eight Race Engineering-built FG Falcon, backed by Wilson Security.

Supercheap Auto Racing announced the identity of their new driver as graduation Fujitsu Series driver Tim Slade. Slade replaced Paul Morris, who retired at the end of the 2008 season.

Team Kiwi Racing finalised a deal for the 2009 season to run a Paul Morris Motorsport Holden Commodore. Bankruptcy proceedings involving Team Kiwi Racing team principal, David John, meant for an uncertain future and the team was unable to prepare adequately for the 2009 season. The franchise was run as a satellite entry of Paul Morris Motorsport on Team Kiwi Racing's behalf for the first two events of the year while the situation was clarified, thus avoiding approximately $150,000 fines for each race meeting they might have been absent, with former Carrera Cup racer Dean Fiore in the driving seat. V8 Supercar Australia subsequently seized TKR's Racing Entitlement Contract in order that it be sold or leased. It was sold to Fiore, who completed the season under the Triple F Racing banner. The racing number was changed for Triple F's second outing from #021 to #12.

V8 Supercar Australia announced four wildcards entries into the two 'enduro' events (L&H 500 and Supercheap Auto Bathurst 1000). The four teams selected from those who made submissions were all competitors in the second-tier Fujitsu V8 Supercar Series,  namely: Greg Murphy Racing, MW Motorsport, Sieders Racing Team and Sonic Motor Racing Services.

Greg Murphy Racing ran a VE Commodore built by their sister-team Tasman Motorsport with Fujitsu series regular Sam Walter named as one of the drivers. Taz Douglas was later named as the second driver.

The family-run Sieders Racing Team used the 2006 Bathurst 1000 winning Triple Eight BF Falcon for brothers Colin and David Sieders. Subsequently, Colin Sieders withdrew citing imminent surgery and was replaced with V8 Ute Series racer Andrew Fisher.

MW Motorsport were represented by their young up-and-coming drivers Damien Assaillit and Brad Lowe, to give them experience ahead of a possible promotion to a main game full-time or co-driver role in 2010.

Sonic Motor Racing Services ultimately withdrew their entry and V8 Supercar Australia decided not to allow them to be replaced with another team.

Points system
Points are awarded to any driver that completes 75% of race distance and is running on the completion of the final lap.

NOTES:

Std denotes all races except the L&H 500, Bathurst 1000, and Surfers Paradise.  These three races have unique rules.

L&H 500:   Phillip Island races are split into qualifying races and 500 km feature race.  The two drivers per team will be grouped into separate qualifying races that will count towards drivers' individual point totals and towards the starting grid for the feature race.  The two drivers will then race one car for the 500 km endurance race.

Bathurst:  Both drivers will share one car for entire race.

Surfers Paradise:  Four races.

Championship standings

Drivers Championship

Teams Championship

 (s) denotes a single-car team.
 (w) denotes an endurance race wildcard team.

Manufacturers Championship
Ford was awarded the Manufacturers Championship for 2009.

See also
 2009 V8 Supercar season

References

Supercars Championship seasons
V8 Supercar Championship Series

sv:V8 Supercar 2009